Stevenia is a genus of flies in the family Rhinophoridae. They are small, slender, black, bristly flies phylogenetically close to the Tachinidae.

Species
Species within this genus include:
S. acutangula (Villeneuve, 1910)
S. angustifrons Villeneuve, 1912
S. atramentaria (Meigen, 1824)
S. deceptoria (Loew, 1847)
S. eggeri (Strobl, 1906)
S. fausti (Portshinsky, 1875)
S. fernandezi Báez, 1979
S. maeotica Belanovsky, 1951
S. nudiseta Belanovsky, 1951
S. obscuripennis (Loew, 1847)
S. pannonica Villeneuve, 1919
S. signata (Mik, 1866)
S. triangulata (Loew, 1847)
S. umbratica (Fallén, 1820)

References

Rhinophoridae
Schizophora genera